Peter Joseph Cronan (born January 13, 1955) is a former American football linebacker in the National Football League (NFL) for the Washington Redskins and the Seattle Seahawks.  He played college football at Boston College. He has been the color commentator on the Boston College radio broadcasts since 1988. His broadcast partners have included, Gil Santos, Dale Arnold, Dick Lutsk, Sean McDonough, Sean Grande, John Rooke, and his current partner Jon Meterparel.

References

1955 births
Living people
American football linebackers
Boston College Eagles football players
Seattle Seahawks players
Washington Redskins players
People from Bourne, Massachusetts
Sportspeople from Barnstable County, Massachusetts
Sportspeople from Framingham, Massachusetts
Players of American football from Massachusetts